Aden TV is the second public national television channel in Yemen. The station is based in Aden. It was established in 1964 by British protection in Aden following Aden Emergency. It started broadcasting on 11 September 1964.

References

External links 
Youtube Channel

Television in Yemen
Television stations in Yemen
Television channels and stations established in 1964